Taber  is a town in southern Alberta, Canada that is surrounded by the Municipal District of Taber.

Taber is famous for its corn due to the large amounts of sunshine the area receives. It is therefore known as the Corn Capital of Canada and holds an annual "Cornfest" in the last week of August.

History 
Originally, Taber was known as "Tank No. 77," and was used by the railway to fill up on water. In 1903, it is said that the first Mormon settlers from the U.S. were the ones to establish a hamlet at the Tank. After the town's post office was built in 1907, the CPR decided to call the town "Tabor," probably after Mount Tabor in the Holy Land. However, various letters and station heads came out printed "Taber," so the CPR changed the name to make it match the records.

An alternate version of the town's name origin is that the first part of the word tabernacle was used by Mormon settlers in the vicinity, and the next Canadian Pacific Railway station was named Elcan (nacle spelled backwards).

After time, Taber became a successful coal mining town. Coal mining declined in the late 1920s, but picked up in the 1930s after extensive irrigation in the area.

During the Second World War, Japanese Canadians were forcibly relocated to Alberta where some were compelled into forced labor, many in sugar beet cultivation, for the duration of the war.

Irrigation helped not only the coal miners, it also brought with it the production of sugar beets. In 1950, a sugar beet processing plant (Roger's Sugar) was built, which has become a vital part of the town's economy.

A number of archaeological discoveries were made in the vicinity of Taber, including that of extinct buffalo, and the so-called "Taber child"  in 1961 by the head of a Geological Survey of Canada team Dr. Archie Stalker in the glacial deposits along the east bank of the Oldman River.

Geography

Climate 

Taber experiences a semi-arid climate (Köppen climate classification BSk).

Demographics 

The population of the Town of Taber according to its 2020 municipal census is 8,711, a  change from its 2015 municipal census population of 8,380.

In the 2016 Census of Population conducted by Statistics Canada, the Town of Taber recorded a population of 8,428 living in 3,159 of its 3,384 total private dwellings, a  change from its 2011 population of 8,104.

Economy 
Taber's economy is largely based on agriculture. Local produce includes hogs, beef, sheep, poultry, sugar beets, potatoes, peas, carrots, wheat, flax, barley, corn, beans, sunflowers, oats, onions, canola and mustard.

Roger's Sugar is Taber's sugar beet processing plant, which was built in 1950. The factory is owned and operated by Lantic Inc. There are several food processing companies based in the town, including a Frito-Lay factory, which produces various snack products for much of Western Canada. As well, sand and gravel are mined here. To a smaller extent, there is also a significant oil and gas component to the economy.

Arts and culture

Cornfest 
Cornfest is an annual summer festival held on the last full weekend in August, and includes a midway (rides, booths, and tests of skill) and a stage with performers. It is the largest free family festival in Western Canada, and is organized by the Taber and District Chamber of Commerce. There are a number of corn-based activities, such as corn tasting and stuffing. Corn stuffing involves two people, one wearing an oversized coverall. One of the contestants attempts to stuff as much corn as possible into the other's coverall. Whichever team can put the most corn in the coveralls in the allotted time wins. During Cornfest, large-scale, local corn producers enter their best varieties in the 'Best Corn of the Year' award.

Taber is home to one of the Canada 150 Mosaic murals. It depicts Tank 77 within a field of corn, and the tiles were painted by members of the community. The mural was unveiled in December 2016, and is housed within the Taber Health Clinic.

Government 
The Town of Taber gained notoriety when it adopted a bylaw on February 23, 2015, that granted the police and bylaw officials the authority to levy fines for controversial actions including swearing, public assembly, spitting and applying graffiti on one's own private property. The bylaw also implemented a curfew. The adoption met criticism over its appearance of being unconstitutional; violating freedoms of expression and association protected under Section Two of the Canadian Charter of Rights and Freedoms. The town defended its adoption stating the bylaw "is intended to consolidate existing municipal regulations and allow enforcement under a municipal bylaw rather than the Criminal Code" and citing concerns about unnecessary prosecutions clogging the court. Mayor Henk De Vlieger supported the bylaw while stating that town council would review the bylaw after a six-month trial.

Taber Police Service 

The Taber Police Service (TPS) is the municipal police force for the Town of Taber. Graham Abela is the current chief of police. Taber is the only town in Alberta to have its own police service. The TPS was established in 1904.

Education 
Kindergarten through grade 12 education is administered in Taber by the Horizon School Division and Holy Spirit Roman Catholic Division. The two high schools in Taber are W.R. Myers High School and St. Mary's School. Taber has a Christian School for kindergarten through grade 9. Other education systems include Community Adult Learning Council, ACE Place Learning Center and a Career Resource Centre.

Sister cities 
Taber and Higashiomi are sister towns. In 1981, the Town of Taber and Notogawa, Japan signed the original Twinned Municipalities Agreement. When Notogawa was merged into the City of Higashiomi in 2006, the two municipalities re-signed the Twinning Agreement.

Notable people 
Gavin Crawford, actor and comedian (This Hour Has 22 Minutes)
Brandon Davidson, professional ice hockey player
Sally Ito, writer
Ron Lloyd, Commander Royal Canadian Navy 2016-2019
Corb Lund, Musician
Johnny Longden, jockey and horse trainer
Devin Setoguchi, professional ice hockey player
Kenneth B. Storey, biology professor at Carleton University, among the top 2% of highly cited scientists in the world.

See also 
List of communities in Alberta
List of towns in Alberta

References

External links 

 
1905 establishments in Alberta
Latter-day Saint settlements in Canada
Towns in Alberta